Love Is a Good Woman is a compilation album by Australian country music artist John Williamson. The album in a compilation of Williamson's love songs. The album included two new tracks; "Good Woman" and "Misty Blue".

At the ARIA Music Awards of 1994, the album was nominated for Best Country Album.

Track listing

Release history

References

1993 compilation albums
John Williamson (singer) compilation albums
EMI Records compilation albums